Đorđo Peruničić (born 4 August 1993) is a Montenegrin handball player who plays for RK Partizan - Tivat and occasionally for the Montenegrin national team.

References

1993 births
Living people
Montenegrin male handball players
Sportspeople from Cetinje